The 1998 ACC Trophy was a cricket tournament in Nepal, taking place from 3 October to 13 October 1998. It gave Associate and Affiliate members of the Asian Cricket Council experience of international one-day cricket and also helped form an essential part of regional rankings. The tournament was won by Bangladesh who defeated Malaysia in the final by 8 wickets. This would be Bangladesh's final ACC Trophy title prior to their elevation to Test status in 2000.

Teams
The teams were separated into two groups of five. The following teams took part in the tournament:

Group stages
The top two from each group qualified for the semi-finals.

Group A

Group B

Semi-finals

Final

Statistics

References

External links
CricketArchive tournament page 

1998 in Nepalese sport
International cricket competitions from 1997–98 to 2000
1998
International cricket competitions in Nepal